Gwernogle is an isolated hamlet in Carmarthenshire, Wales, nestled in the Brechfa Forest.

The Ty Cwrdd Welsh Independent Chapel is situated in the hamlet, next to the old post office. The chapel was first built in 1749, before being rebuilt in 1819, and renovated in 1890.

References

Hamlets in Wales
Villages in Carmarthenshire